E2D may refer to:
 Estradiol decanoate
 trans-4,5-Epoxy-(E)-2-decenal